Monacha syriaca is a species of gastropods belonging to the family Hygromiidae.

The species is found in Mediterranean.

References

Hygromiidae